Hestina japonica is an East Palearctic species of siren butterfly found in Japan (H. j. japonica) and Korea ( H. j. seoki).

Subspecies
Hestina japonica japonica Japan
Hestina japonica seoki Shirôzu, 1955 (Korea)

References

Apaturinae
Butterflies described in 1862